Michael Te Arawa Bennett is a New Zealand writer and director for film and television.

Career 
He is the co-creator, writer, showrunner and executive producer of TVNZ's Vegas. He is also the author of In Dark Places, a study of the wrongful conviction of Teina Pora for the 1992 murder of Susan Burdett, which won the 2017 Ngaio Marsh crime writing award. His 2022 crime novel, Better the Blood, was shortlisted for the Jann Medlicott Acorn Prize for Fiction at the 2023 Ockham New Zealand Book Awards.

Partial filmography
 Vegas – 2021 (Writer/Producer, Television Series)
 In Dark Places – 2018 (Writer/Director, Television Film)
 Matariki – 2010 (Writer/Director, Feature Film ) – Toronto International Film Festival
 Outrageous Fortune – 2005–2007 (Writer/Director, Television Series)
 Maddigan's Quest – 2006 (Writer, Television Series)
 The Lost Children – 2006 (Writer, Television Series)
 Kerosene Creek – 2004 (Writer/Director, Short Film) – Berlin Film Festival
 Cow – 2002 (Writer/Director, Short Film) – Cannes Film Festival
 Mataku – 2002 (Writer/Director, Television Series)
 Street Legal – 2000 (Writer, Television Series)
 Michelle's Third Novel – 1994 (Writer, Short Film) – opened for Pulp Fiction at the New York Film Festival

Personal life
 He and actor Manu Bennett are cousins. 
 He is Maori and is of Te Arawa descent.

References

External links
 Official Website
 
 Michael Bennett NZ on Screen

New Zealand film directors
Living people
People from Reefton
Year of birth missing (living people)